Anna Smith is an English film reporter, former chair of the London Film Critics' Circle, and host of the Girls on Film podcast. She has contributed to the BBC, Sky News, Time Out, the Guardian and The Film Review.

Biography

Smith studied journalism at the University of Wales Cardiff, worked on various magazines in the 1990s, including being launch editor of Wax, a dance music magazine, and started to do film reviews while assistant editor of Minx. After Minx closed in July 2000, Smith focussed on freelance film writing.
 

Smith was chair of the London Film Critics' Circle in 2014, and President of their Critics' Circle.

Smith started the Girls on Film podcast in 2018.  Guests have included Caitlin Moran and Coky Giedroyc, Kitty Green, Haifaa al-Mansour, Gurinder Chadha and Brie Larson.

References

External links
  
 

Alumni of Cardiff University
English film critics
Living people
British radio presenters
British women radio presenters
British women critics
British women film critics
Year of birth missing (living people)
Presidents of the Critics' Circle